Azrael ('God has helped') is the angel of death in some Abrahamic religions, namely Islam, Christian popular culture, and some traditions of Judaism.

Relative to similar concepts of such beings, Azrael holds a rather benevolent role as God's angel of death; he acts as a psychopomp, responsible for transporting the souls of the deceased after their death. Both in Islam and in Judaism, he is said to hold a scroll concerning the fate of mortals, recording and erasing their names at their birth and death, respectively.

Depending on the perspective and precepts of the various religions in which he is a figure, he may also be portrayed as a resident of the Third Heaven, a division of heaven in Judaism and Islam. In Islam, he is one of the four archangels, and is identified with the Quranic Malak al-Mawt, which corresponds with the Hebrew-language term Mal'akh ha-Maweth in Rabbinic literature. In Hebrew, Azrael translates to "Angel of God" or "Help from God".

Etymology in Judaism
The name Azrael indicates a Hebrew-language origin, and archeological evidence found in Jewish settlements in Mesopotamia confirm that it was indeed used in Aramaic Incantation texts from the 7th century. However, as the text only lists names, it cannot be determined whether Azrael was associated with death before the advent of Islam.

After the emergence of Islam, the name Azrael became popular among both Jewish and Islamic literature, as well as folklore. The name spelled as Ezrā’ël appears in the Ethiopic version of Apocalypse of Peter (dating to the 16th century) as an angel of hell, who avenges those who had been wronged during life.

Significance in Islam 

Along with Jibrāʾīl, Mīkāʾīl, and Isrāfīl, Azrael is one of the four major archangels in Islam. He is responsible for taking the souls of the deceased away from the body. Azrael does not act independently, but is only informed by God when time is up to take a soul.

In Quran & its exegesis 
Surah 32:11 mentions an angel of death identified with Azrael. When the unbelievers in hell cry out for help, an angel, also identified with Azrael, will appear on the horizon and tell them that they have to remain. Other Quranic verses refer to a multitude of angels of death. According to exegesis, these verses refer to lesser angels of death, subordinative to Azrael, who aid the archangel in his duty. Tafsir al-Baydawi mentions an entire host of angels of death, subordinative to Azrael.

Several modern contemporaries, such as Wahbah al-Zuhayli, and scholars from Islamic University of Madinah, Indonesian religious ministry, Saudi Islamic affair ministry, & Masjid al-Haram have compiled the classical exegesis from chapter Al-Anfal verse 50 , that the angel of death has special tasks during the battle of Badr.

In Hadiths & its exegesis 
According to one Muslim tradition, 40 days before the death of a person approaches, God drops a leaf from a tree below the heavenly throne, on which Azrael reads the name of the person he must take with him. He also had 4,000 wings which consisted of two types, "wings of grace" and "wings of punishment". The "wings of punishment" are made from iron rods, hooks, and scissors. Muqatil ibn Sulayman has recorded his commentary in his commentary work, as-Suluk, the angel possessed 70,000 foot limbs.

Umar ibn Abd al-Aziz, a caliph of Umayyad dynasty, has reported a narration that the angel of death (Malak al-Mawt) is armed with flaming whip. Caliph Umar also reported a narration that the angel of death was so huge that he even dwarfed Bearers of the Throne, group of angels which are known as the biggest among angels.

The "Islamic Book of Dead" describes him with 4 faces, and his whole body consists of eyes and tongues whose number corresponds to the number of humans inhabiting the Earth.

Relationship between Azrael and Death 
Islam elaborated further narratives concerning the relation between Azrael and Death. Christian Lange mentioned that according to some scholars Azrael and Death were one entity; other exegesis scholars opined Azrael and Death were different entities, with Death as some kind of tool used by Azrael to take life.

One account explains death and its relation to Azrael, representing Death and Azrael as former two separate entities, but when God created Death, God ordered the angels to look upon it and they swoon for a thousand years. After the angels regained consciousness, Death recognized that it must submit to Azrael. The identification of "Death" and angel Azrael as one entity were explained in a Hadith about the fate of "Death" entity itself after the judgment day, where classical hanafite scholar Badr al-Din al-Ayni has interpreted in that Hadith which compiled in Sahih Bukhari collection, that Death would take on the form of a ram, then placed between paradise and hell, and finally slaughtered by God himself, causing Death cease to exist, which followed by God to declare to both people of paradise and hell that eternity has begun, and their state will never end. Lange mentioned that according to some scholars, the ram in that Hadith narration is no other than the angel of death himself, while others assert, this to be death's own form in the hereafter.

In other account sourced from Muqatil ibn Sulayman, Azrael and death were said as one entity as he reported the angel has number of faces and hands equal to the number of living creatures on his body, where each of those faces and hands are connected with the life of each souls in the living world. Whenever a face within Azrael body vanished, then the soul which connected with it will experience death. Furthermore, related interpretation from several groups of modern Islamic scholars from Imam Mohammad Ibn Saud Islamic University in Yemen and Mauritania has issued fatwa that taken the interpretation from Ibn Kathir regarding Quran chapter Al-An'am verse 61, and a hadith transmitted by Abu Hurairah and Ibn Abbas, that the angel of death has assisting angels who helped him taking souls.

The eighth Umayyad Caliph Umar ibn Abd al-Aziz once reported the commentary regarding Azrael in Quran chapter As-Sajdah verse 11 , that taking many lives are very easy for the angel, that in caliph's words "it as if the entire mankind on earth were only like dish on the plate from the perspective of Malak al-Mawt (angel of death)". Meanwhile, Al-Qurtubi has narrated from the authority of Mujahid ibn Jabr that the world being between the hands of the Angel of Death is "similar to a vessel between the hands of a human; he takes from whatever place he wants", where Mujahid described that Azrael is able to seize many souls at the same moment because God made the earth shrunk for him until it seems as if it is a vessel between his hands. A similar Marfu' Hadith (i.e., with an elevated chain of transmission) was reported by Zuhayr ibn Muhammad.

In folklore 
Azrael kept his importance in everyday life. According to the Sufi teacher Al-Jili, Azrael appears to the soul in a form provided by its most powerful metaphors. A common belief holds that the lesser angels of death are for the common people, while saints and prophets meet the archangel of death himself. Great prophets such as Moses and Muhammad are invited politely by him, but saints are also said to meet Azrael in beautiful forms. It is said that, when Rumi was about to die, he laid in his bed and met Azrael in human shape. The belief that Azrael appears to saints before they actually die to prepare themselves for death, is also attested by the testament of Nasir Khusraw, in which he claims to have met Azrael during his sleep, informing him about his upcoming death.

According to another famous narrative which recorded by Ibn Kathir in his work, Qishaash al-Anbiya (story of the prophets), God once ordered Gabriel, Mikael, Israfil, and Azrael to collect dust from earth from which Adam is supposed to be created. Only Azrael succeeded, whereupon he was destined to become the angel concerning life and death of humanity.

Western reception
The Islamic notion of Azrael, including some narratives such as the tale of Solomon, a hadith reaching back to Shahr Ibn Hawshab, was already known in America in the 18th century as attested by Gregory Sharpe and James Harris.

Some Western adaptions extended the physical description of Azrael, hence the poet Leigh Hunt depicts Azrael as wearing a black-hooded cloak. Although lacking the eminent scythe, his portrayal nevertheless resembles the Grim Reaper. Henry Wadsworth Longfellow mentions Azrael in "The Reaper and the Flowers" as an angel of death, but he is not equated with Samael, the angel of death in Jewish lore who appears as a fallen and malevolent angel, instead. Azrael also appears in G. K. Chesterton's poem "Lepanto" as one of the Islamic spirits commanded by "Mahound" (Muhammad) to resist Don John of Austria's crusade. In The Smurfs, the cat of the evil wizard Gargamel is called Azrael.

See also

 Angels in Islam
 Azriel (disambiguation)
 Baron Samedi, personification of Death in Haitian Vodou
 Charon
 Death (personification)
 Destroying angel (Bible)
 Dumah (angel)
 List of angels in theology
 Punishment of the Grave
 Saureil, angel of death in Mandaeism
 Santa Muerte
 Thanatos, the personification of Death in Greek mythology

Appendix

Notes

References 

Angels in Judaism
Angels of death
Archangels in Islam
Archangels
Individual angels
Psychopomps